is a train station located in Ōmuta, Fukuoka.

Lines 
Nishi-Nippon Railroad
Tenjin Ōmuta Line

Platforms

Adjacent stations

Surrounding area
 Mount Amagiyama
 Meiko Gakuen Elementary and Junior High School
 Ariakeshinsei High School
 Omuta Kita High School
 Yoshinotenshi Kindergarten
 Yoshino Station
 Kuranaga Post Office
 Fukuyama Ophthalmology Clinic
 Ochiai Neurosurgery
 Shiratani Akiraharu Grocery Store
 Kuragana Police box

Railway stations in Fukuoka Prefecture
Railway stations in Japan opened in 1938